Gisèle Meygret (30 July 1963 – 25 July 1999) was a French fencer. She competed in the women's foil events at the 1988 and 1992 Summer Olympics.

References

External links
 

1963 births
1999 deaths
French female foil fencers
Olympic fencers of France
Fencers at the 1988 Summer Olympics
Fencers at the 1992 Summer Olympics
Sportspeople from Nice
20th-century French women